Asiab-e Kereshki (also Romanized as Āsīāb-e Kereshkī; also known as Kāz̧emīyeh) is a village in Khafrak-e Olya Rural District, Seyyedan District, Marvdasht County, Fars Province, Iran. At the 2006 census, its population was 58, in 13 families.

References 

Populated places in Marvdasht County